The Ottoman–Habsburg wars were fought from the 16th through the 18th centuries between the Ottoman Empire and the Habsburg monarchy, which was at times supported by the Kingdom of Hungary, Polish–Lithuanian Commonwealth, and Habsburg Spain. The wars were dominated by land campaigns in Hungary, including Transylvania (today in Romania) and Vojvodina (today in Serbia), Croatia, and central Serbia.

By the 16th century, the Ottomans had become a serious threat to the European powers, with Ottoman ships sweeping away Venetian possessions in the Aegean and Ionian seas and Ottoman-supported Barbary pirates seizing Spanish possessions in the Maghreb. The Protestant Reformation, French–Habsburg rivalry and the numerous civil conflicts of the Holy Roman Empire distracted the Christians from their conflict with the Ottomans. Meanwhile, the Ottomans had to contend with the Persian Safavid Empire and to a lesser extent the Mamluk Sultanate, which was defeated and fully incorporated into the empire.

Initially, Ottoman conquests in Europe made significant gains with a decisive victory at Mohács reducing around one third (central) part of the Kingdom of Hungary to the status of an Ottoman tributary. Later, the Peace of Westphalia and the Spanish War of Succession in the 17th and 18th centuries respectively left the Austrian Empire as the sole firm possession of the House of Habsburg. After the siege of Vienna in 1683, the Habsburgs assembled a large coalition of European powers known as the Holy League, allowing them to fight the Ottomans and to regain control over Hungary. The Great Turkish War ended with the decisive Holy League victory at Zenta. The wars ended after Austria's participation in the war of 1787-1791, which Austria fought allied with Russia. Intermittent tension between Austria and the Ottoman Empire continued throughout the nineteenth century, but they never fought each other in a war and ultimately found themselves allied in World War I, in the aftermath of which both empires were dissolved.

Historians have focused on the second siege of Vienna of 1683, depicting it as a decisive Austrian victory that saved Western civilization and marked the decline of the Ottoman Empire. Recent historians have taken a broader perspective, noting that the Habsburgs at the same time resisted internal separatist movements and were fighting Prussia and France for control of central Europe. The key advance made by the Europeans was an effective combined arms doctrine involving the cooperation of infantry, artillery and cavalry. Nevertheless, the Ottomans were able to maintain military parity with the Habsburgs until the middle of the eighteenth century. Historian Gunther E. Rothenberg has emphasized the non-combat dimension of the conflict, whereby the Habsburgs built up military communities that protected their borders and produced a steady flow of well-trained, motivated soldiers.

Origins

While the Habsburgs were occasionally the Kings of Hungary and Emperors of the Holy Roman Empire (and almost always that of the Holy Roman Empire after the 15th century), the wars between the Hungarians and the Ottomans included other dynasties as well. Naturally, the Ottoman Wars in Europe attracted support from the West, where the advancing and powerful Islamic state was seen as a threat to Christendom in Europe. The Crusades of Nicopolis (1396) and of Varna (1443–44) marked the most determined attempts by Europe to halt the Turkic advance into Central Europe and the Balkans.

For a while the Ottomans were too busy trying to put down Balkan rebels such as Vlad Dracula. However, the defeat of these and other rebellious vassal states opened up Central Europe to Ottoman invasion. The Kingdom of Hungary now bordered the Ottoman Empire and its vassals.

After King Louis II of Hungary was killed at the Battle of Mohács in 1526, his widow Queen Mary of Austria fled to her brother the Archduke of Austria, Ferdinand I. Ferdinand's claim to the throne of Hungary was further strengthened by his marriage to Anne, the sister of King Louis II and the only family member claimant to the throne of the shattered Kingdom. Consequently, Ferdinand I was elected King of Bohemia, and at the Diet of Pozsony he and his wife were elected King and Queen of Hungary. This clashed with the Turkish objective of placing the puppet John Szapolyai on the throne, thus setting the stage for a conflict between the two powers.

List of Austro-Ottoman conflicts

Habsburg advance

The Austrian lands were in miserable economic and financial conditions, thus Ferdinand desperately introduced the so-called Turkish Tax (Türken Steuer). Despite this, he was not able to collect enough money to pay the expenses of the defense costs of the Austrian lands. His annual revenues only allowed him to hire 5.000 mercenaries for two months, thus Ferdinand asked help from his brother Emperor Charles V, and started to borrow money from rich bankers like the Fugger family.

Ferdinand I attacked Hungary, a state severely weakened by civil conflict, in 1527, in an attempt to drive out John Szapolyai and enforce his authority there. John was unable to prevent Ferdinand's campaigning, which led to the capture of Buda and several other key settlements along the Danube. Despite this, the Ottoman sultan was slow to react and only came to the aid of his vassal when he launched an army of about 120,000 men on 10 May 1529. The Austrian branch of Habsburg monarchs needed the economic power of Hungary for the Ottoman wars. During the Ottoman wars the territory of former Kingdom of Hungary shrunk by around 70%; despite these territorial and demographic losses, the smaller, heavily war-torn Royal Hungary remained economically more important than Austria or Kingdom of Bohemia at the end of the 16th century, as it was Ferdinand's largest source of revenue.

Technological advantage of the Western Christian forces

The earliest type of Turkish hand cannons are called as "Şakaloz", which word came from the Hungarian hand cannon "Szakállas puska" in the 15th century.

Although Ottoman janissaries adopted firearms in battles since the beginning of the 16th century, the Ottoman usage of the handheld firearms spread much more slowly than in the Western Christian armies. Wheel-lock firearms were unfamiliar for Ottoman soldiers until the siege of Székesfehérvár in 1543, despite the fact they had been used for decades by Christian armies in Kingdom of Hungary and in Western Europe. According to a report from 1594, the Ottoman soldiers hadn't adopted the pistol yet.

In 1602 the grand vizier reported from Hungarian front about the firepower superiority of the Christian forces: "in a field or during a siege we are in distressed position, because the greater part of the enemy forces are infantry armed with muskets, while the majority of our forces are horsemen, and we have very few specialists skilled in the musket"According to Alvise Foscarini's (Venetian ambassador in Istanbul) report in 1637, "few Janissaries even knew how to use an arquebus"

Siege of Vienna

Ottoman sultan Suleiman the Magnificent easily wrested from Ferdinand most of the gains he had achieved in the previous two years – to the disappointment of Ferdinand I, only the fortress of Bratislava resisted. Considering the size of Suleiman's army and the devastation wrought upon Hungary in the previous few years it is not surprising that the will to resist one of the world's most powerful states was lacking in many of the recently garrisoned Habsburg settlements.

The Sultan arrived at Vienna on 27 September 1529. Ferdinand's army was some 16,000 strong – he was outnumbered roughly 7 to 1 and the walls of Vienna were an invitation to Ottoman cannon (6 ft thick along some parts). However, the heavy cannons on which the Ottomans relied to breach the walls were all abandoned on the way to Vienna, after they got stuck in mud due to heavy rainfall. Ferdinand defended Vienna with great vigour. By 12 October, after much mining and counter-mining an Ottoman war council was called and on 14 October the Ottomans abandoned the siege. The retreat of the Ottoman army was hampered by the resistance of Bratislava which attmepted to attack Ottoman forces . Early snowfall made matters worse, and it would be another three years before Suleiman could campaign in Hungary.

Little War

After the defeat at Vienna, the Ottoman Sultan had to turn his attention to other parts of his domain. Taking advantage of this absence, Archduke Ferdinand launched an offensive in 1530, recapturing Esztergom and other forts. An assault on Buda was only thwarted by the presence of Ottoman Turkish soldiers.

As in the previous Austrian offensive, the return of the Ottomans forced the Habsburgs in Austria to go on the defensive. In 1532 Suleiman sent a massive Ottoman army to take Vienna. However, the army took a different route to Kőszeg. After a defence by a mere 700-strong force led by the Croatian earl Nikola Jurišić, the defenders accepted an "honorable" surrender of the fortress in return for their safety. The Sultan then withdrew, content with his success, and recognizing the limited Austrian gains in Hungary, while forcing Ferdinand to recognize John Szapolyai as King of Hungary.

Whilst the peace between the Austrians and the Ottomans would last for nine years, John Szapolyai and Ferdinand found it convenient to continue skirmishes along their respective borders. In 1537 Ferdinand broke the peace treaty by sending his ablest generals to a disastrous siege of Osijek, which was another Ottoman triumph. Nevertheless, Ferdinand was recognized by the Treaty of Nagyvárad as the heir of the Kingdom of Hungary.

After the death of John Szapolyai in 1540, Ferdinand's inheritance was robbed, given instead to John's son, John II Sigismund. Attempting to enforce the treaty, the Austrians advanced on Buda where they experienced another defeat by Suleiman; the elderly Austrian General Rogendorf proved to be incompetent. Suleiman then finished off the remaining Austrian troops and proceeded to de facto annex Hungary. By the time a peace treaty was enforced in 1551, Habsburg Hungary had been reduced to little more than border land. In 1552 the forces of the Ottoman Empire led by Kara Ahmed Pasha laid siege on the Castle of Eger, located in the northern part of the Kingdom of Hungary, but the defenders led by István Dobó repelled the attacks and defended the castle of Eger. The siege of Eger (1552) become an emblem of national defense and patriotic heroism in Hungary's occupations

After the seizure of Buda by the Turks in 1541, west and north Hungary recognized a Habsburg as king ("Royal Hungary"), while the central and southern counties were occupied by the Sultan ("Ottoman Hungary"), and the east became the Principality of Transylvania. The vast majority of the seventeen and nineteen thousands Ottoman soldiers in service in the Ottoman fortresses in the territory of Hungary were Orthodox and Muslim Balkan Slavs instead of ethnic Turkish people. Southern Slavs were also acting as akinjis and other light troops intended for pillaging in the territory of present-day Hungary.

There were wasted opportunities on both sides in the Little War; Austrian attempts to increase their influence in Hungary were just as unsuccessful as the Ottoman drives to Vienna. Nonetheless, there were no illusions as to the status quo: the Ottoman Empire was still a very powerful and dangerous threat. Even so, the Austrians would go on the offensive again, their generals building a bloody reputation for so much loss of life. Costly battles like those fought at Buda and Osijek were avoided but not absent in the upcoming conflicts. In any case Habsburg interests were split between fighting for devastated European land under Islamic control, trying to stop the gradual decentralization of Imperial authority in Germany, and for Spain's ambitions in North Africa, the Low Countries and against the French. Nevertheless, the Ottomans, whilst hanging on to their supreme power, could not expand as they had in the days of Mehmet and Bayezid. To the east lay further wars against their Shi'ite opponents, the Safavids. Both the French (since 1536) and the Dutch (since 1612) occasionally worked together against the Habsburgs with the Ottomans.

Suleiman the Magnificent led one final campaign in 1566, ending at the siege of Szigetvár. The Siege was meant to be only a temporary stop before taking on Vienna. However, the fortress withstood against the Sultan's armies. Eventually the Sultan, already an old man at 72 years (ironically campaigning to restore his health), died. The Royal Physician was strangled to prevent news from reaching the troops and the unaware Ottomans took the fort, ending the campaign shortly afterward without making a move against Vienna.

War in the Mediterranean

1480–1541

Meanwhile, the Ottoman Empire rapidly began displacing its Christian opponents at sea. In the 14th century, the Ottomans had only a small navy. By the 15th century, hundreds of ships were in the Ottoman arsenal taking on Constantinople and challenging the naval powers of the Italian Republics of Venice and Genoa. In 1480, the Ottomans unsuccessfully laid siege to Rhodes Island, the stronghold of the Knights of St. John. When the Ottomans returned in 1522, they were more successful and the Christian powers lost a crucial naval base.

In retaliation, Charles V led a massive Holy League of 60,000 soldiers against the Ottoman city of Tunis. After Hayreddin Barbarossa's fleet was defeated by a Genoan one, Charles' army put 30,000 of the city's residents to the sword. Afterwards, the Spanish placed a friendlier Muslim leader in power. The campaign was not an unmitigated success; many Holy League soldiers succumbed to dysentery, only natural for such a large overseas army. Furthermore, much of Barbarossa's fleet was not present in North Africa and the Ottomans won a victory against the Holy League in 1538 at the Battle of Preveza in western Greece.

In 1541, Charles led an amphibious attack on the Ottoman stronghold of Algiers, which was defended by Hasan Agha, an Italian renegade from Sardinia. As Charles put ashore, Andrea Doria's accompanying fleet was battered by a storm and many ships were lost. Charles's land force marched toward Algiers, but sorties by Janissaries halted the advance, and Charles withdrew.

Siege of Malta

Despite the loss of Rhodes, Cyprus (an island farther from Europe than Rhodes) remained Venetian. When the Knights of St. John moved to Malta, the Ottomans found that their victory at Rhodes only displaced the problem; Ottoman ships came under frequent attacks by the Knights, as they attempted to stop Ottoman expansion to the West. Not to be outdone, Ottoman ships struck many parts of southern Europe and around Italy, as part of their wider war with France against the Habsburgs (See Italian Wars). The situation finally came to a head when Suleiman, the victor at Rhodes in 1522 and at the Battle of Djerba, decided in 1565 to destroy the Knights' base at Malta. The presence of the Ottoman fleet so close to the Papacy alarmed the Spanish, who began assembling first a small expeditionary force (that arrived in time for the siege) and then a larger fleet to relieve the Island. The ultra-modern star-shaped fort of St Elmo was taken only with heavy casualties including the Ottoman general Turgut Reis, and the rest of the island was too much. Even so, Barbary piracy continued and the victory at Malta had no effect on Ottoman military strength in the Mediterranean.

Cyprus and Lepanto

The death of Suleiman the Magnificent in 1566 brought Selim II to power. Known by some as "Selim the Sot", he assembled a massive expedition to take Cyprus from Venice.  An option that Selim opted out of was to assist the Moorish rebellion that had been instigated by the Spanish crown to root out disloyal Moors. Had Selim succeeded in landing in the Iberian peninsula, he may have been cut off, for after he had captured Cyprus in 1571 he suffered a decisive naval defeat at the Battle of Lepanto. The Holy League, assembled by the Pope to defend the Island, arrived too late to save it (despite 11 months of resistance at Famagusta); having collected so much of Europe's available military strength, the Holy League was better supplied with ammunition and armor and inflicted a blow on the Ottomans. The chance to retake Cyprus was wasted in the typical squabbling that followed the victory, so that when the Venetians signed a peace treaty with the Ottomans in 1573, they did so according to Ottoman terms.

War in the Indian Ocean and Southeast Asia

In addition, the Empire became a dominant naval force, controlling much of the Mediterranean Sea. By this time, the Ottoman Empire was a major part of the European political sphere. The Ottomans became involved in multi-continental religious wars when Spain and Portugal were united under the Iberian Union lead by the Habsburg monarch King Philip the Second, the Ottomans as holders of the Caliph title, meaning leader of all Muslims worldwide, and Iberians, as leaders of the Christian crusaders, were locked in a worldwide conflict, with zones of operations in the Mediterranean sea and Indian Ocean where Iberians circumnavigated Africa to reach India, and in the way, wage wars upon the Ottomans and its local Muslim allies and likewise the Iberians passed through newly Christianised Latin-America and had sent expeditions that traversed the Pacific in order to Christianize the partially Muslim Philippines and use it as a base to further attack the Muslims in the far east. In which case, the Ottomans sent armies to aid its easternmost vassal and territory, the Sultanate of Aceh in Southeast Asia. During the 17th century, the bloody worldwide conflict between the Ottoman Caliphate and Iberian Union was nevertheless a stalemate, since both powers were at similar population, technology and economic levels.

The Luzones and the Conquest of Philippines by the Spanish Habsburgs

During the 1500s, The Luzones were a people coming from Luzon, Philippines that had trade and military networks across South, Southeast, and East Asia, and had found employment both for the Ottoman and Portuguese sides back when the Ottomans concentrated assistance to Southeast Asian Sultanates on their new protectorate, the Sultanate of Aceh and the Portuguese conquered Malacca. Luzon, where the Luzones were from were divided among Islamized and Pagan peoples (Buddhist, Hindu, and Animist) who fought each other. Nevertheless, Luzones found employment as officials across the region such as the following cases. Due to the invasion of Hindu Tondo by the Sultanate of Brunei which set up the Muslim Rajahnate of Maynila as a puppet-state, the prince of Manila and grandson of Sultan Bolkiah, named Rajah Ache, served as the admiral of the Bruneian navy and had suppressed a Buddhist revolt in Southwest Borneo at the city of Loue as well as served as the enforcer of Bruneian interests in Luzon. Likewise, after the Ottoman expedition to Aceh, the Ottoman commander, Heredim Mafamede sent out from Suez by his uncle, Suleiman, Viceroy of Cairo, when his fleet later took Aru on the Strait of Malacca, which contained 4,000 Muslims from Turkey, Abyssinia, Malabar, Gujarat and Luzon, and following his victory, Heredim left a hand-picked garrison there under the command of a Luzones Filipino by the name of Sapetu Diraja. Sapetu Diraja, was then assigned by the Sultan of Aceh the task of holding Aru (northeast Sumatra) in 1540. The Luzones even joined the attempt for a Muslim reconquest of Malacca against the Portuguese. Luzon mercenaries also participated in an unsuccessful attempt to retake Malacca in 1525 with the help of Portuguese renegade Martin Avelar. The "captain of the Luces" sailed in the flagship with warriors Joao de Barros considered "the most warlike and valiant of these parts." However, the Luzones also found employment in Portuguese Malacca, and one of them, Regimo Diraja was appointed as Temenggung (Jawi: تمڠݢوڠ (Governor and Chief General) over the natives and he even controlled and policed the trade between the Indian Ocean, the Strait of Malacca, the South China Sea, and the medieval maritime principalities of the Philippines. The dual allegiance to the Ottomans and Portuguese, of Filipinos (Lucoes) who had trade networks across East, Southeast and East Asia had effects on Turkish interests in the Indian Ocean because Luzon eventually gave their allegiance to Habsburg controlled Spain at a later date.

1521 saw the beginnings of the Spanish and Habsburg conquest of the Philippines (Including Luzon) by Conquistadors from either Spain or Mexico. The Ferdinand Magellan expedition passed through the Philippines and attempted to conquer the Hindu Rajahnate of Cebu but only succeeded temporarily. Afterwards, in 1543, Ruy López de Villalobos arrived at the islands of Leyte and Samar and named them Las Islas Filipinas in honor of Philip II of Spain, at the time Prince of Asturias and himself a Habsburg, as the name was eventually expanded to label the whole archipelago of The Philippines. European colonialization began in earnest when Spanish explorer Miguel López de Legazpi arrived from Mexico in 1565 and formed the first European settlements in Cebu. Beginning with just five ships and five hundred men accompanied by Augustinian monks, and further strengthened in 1567 by two hundred soldiers, he was able to repel the Portuguese and create the foundations for the colonialization of the Archipelago. In 1571, the Spanish, their Latin-American recruits and their Filipino (Visayan) allies, commanded by able conquistadors such as Mexico-born Juan de Salcedo (who was in love with Tondo's princess, Kandarapa) attacked Maynila, a vassal-state of the Brunei Sultanate and liberated plus incorporated the kingdom of Tondo as well as establishing Manila as the capital of the Spanish East Indies. The Spanish employed the divide and conquer policy of pitting the various Animist, Hindu and Muslim Filipino kingdoms against each other to rapidly conquer a divided people. After the initial conquest, control of the archipelago was cemented by a steady flow of Spanish, Mexican and Peruvian settlers and soldiers from Europe and Latin-America, as the Philippines was governed under the Mexico-based Viceroyalty of New Spain until the onset of Mexican independence.

Ottoman-Bruneian conflict against Spanish-Philippines

The fall of Bruneian Manila to Habsburg Spain had disastrous after effects to Muslim interests, especially among the Bruneians, Ottomans, and Acehnese as the formerly Muslim city-state became a center of Christian crusading against most of the Sultanates of Southeast Asia. The Bruneians raised several fleets to retake Manila but they were frustrated. However, the Spanish in Manila grew afraid of the power of Brunei and one Spaniard named Melchor Davalos warned of the constant migration of even the Turks/Ottomans to Borneo as well as other Muslims from the Middle East. Melchor Davalos was so warry he complained to the Spanish King.

Increasing tension between Spain and Brunei plus its oppressed allies in the Philippines, mainly the Sultanates of Sulu, Maguindanao and Lanao, which was spurred on the by the continual Ottoman and Arab migrations into Brunei some of whom were even defeated veterans of the Battle of Lepanto contrasted with the Spanish and Latin-American migrations to the Philippines, eventually erupted into the violence of the Castille War against Brunei and the Spanish-Moro Wars.

The time the Castilian War broke out was a time of religious fervor in Europe and many parts of the world, when a single state religion was followed. In Spain, the state religion was Roman Catholicism, obliging followers of other faiths such as Jews and Muslims to convert to this religion. Spain had recently finished a 700-year-old war to reconquer and re-Christianise Spain, which had been invaded by the Muslims under the Umayyad Caliphate since the 8th century AD. The long process of reconquest, sometimes through treaties, mostly through war, is known as the Reconquista. The hatred of Spaniards against the Muslims that once invaded Spain fueled the Castilian War against the similarly Muslim Bruneians. This war also started the Spanish–Moro Wars in the Philippines against the Sultanate of Sulu and Sultanate of Maguindanao.

In 1576, the Spanish Governor in Manila, Francisco de Sande, had arrived from Mexico. He sent an official mission to neighbouring Brunei to meet Sultan Saiful Rijal. He explained to the Sultan that they wanted to have good relations with Brunei and also asked for permission to spread Christianity in Brunei (Roman Catholicism in Brunei was a legacy brought by Spaniards). At the same time, he demanded an end to Brunei proselytism of Islam in the Philippines. Sultan Saiful Rijal would not agree to these terms and also expressed his opposition to the evangelisation of the Philippines, which he deemed part of Dar al-Islam. In reality, de Sande regarded Brunei as a threat to the Spanish presence in the region, claiming that "the Moros from Borneo preach the doctrine of Mohammed, converting all the Moros of the islands".

Spain declared war in 1578. In March that year, the Spanish fleet, led by de Sande himself, acting as Capitán General, started their journey towards Brunei. The expedition consisted of 200 Spaniards and 200 Mexicans, 1,500 Filipino natives, and 300 Borneans. The campaign was one of many, which also included action in Mindanao and Sulu. The racial make-up of the Christian side was likely diverse, as documents a few decades later showed that the infantry was composed of Mestizos, Mulattoes, and "Indians" (From Peru and Mexico), led by Spanish officers who had worked together with native Filipinos in military campaigns across Southeast Asia. The Muslim side though was also equally racially diverse. In addition to the native Malay warriors, the Ottomans had repeatedly sent military expeditions to nearby Aceh. The expeditions were composed mainly of Turks, Egyptians, Swahilis, Somalis, Sindhis, Gujaratis, and Malabars. These expeditionary forces had also spread to other nearby Sultanates such as Brunei and had taught local mujahideen new fighting tactics and techniques on how to forge cannons.

The fighting was fierce but Spain succeeded in invading the capital of Brunei at that time, Kota Batu, on 16 April 1578, with the help of two disgruntled Brunei noblemen, Pengiran Seri Lela and Pengiran Seri Ratna. The former had travelled to Manila to offer Brunei as a tributary of Spain for help to recover the throne usurped by his brother, Saiful Rijal. Spain agreed that if they succeeded in conquering Brunei, Pengiran Seri Lela would indeed become the Sultan, while Pengiran Seri Ratna would be the new Bendahara.

Sultan Saiful Rijal and Paduka Seri Begawan Sultan Abdul Kahar were forced to flee to Meragang, then to Jerudong, where they made plans to chase the conquering army away from Brunei. In the meantime, Spain suffered heavy losses due to a cholera or dysentery outbreak. They were so weakened by the illness. However, this war entering the national conscience as a heroic episode, with the Spaniards being driven out by Pengiran Bendahara Sakam Ibni Sultan Abdul Kahar and a thousand native warriors in order to restore back the Sultan's power over the Empire. The Spanish return to Manila on 26 June 1578, after just 72 days. Before doing so, they burned the mosque, a high structure with a five-tier roof. Afterwards, peaceful relations were restored between the Spaniards and Bruneians. However, a legacy of Castilian-Bruneian war is the Conspiracy of the Maharlikas when the Bruneian aristocracy of Manila attempted an uprising against Spain with Japan and Brunei as allies. The conspiracy was suppressed and the conspirators were exiled to Guerrero, Mexico which later became a center of the Mexican war of independence against Spain. The onset of the Iberian Union resulted in the takeover by the Spanish Habsburgs of the territories held by Portugal across the world, and in this period, the Habsburgs conducted the ongoing Ottoman–Portuguese confrontations in the Indian Ocean and the Mediterranean Sea.

Thirteen Years' War 1593–1606

After the death of Suleiman in 1566, Selim II posed less of a threat to Europe. Though Cyprus was captured at long last, the Ottomans failed against the Habsburgs at sea (see above, Battle of Lepanto). Selim died not too long after, leaving in power his son Murad III, a hedonist who spent more time at his Harem than at the war front. Under such deteriorating circumstances, the Empire found itself at war with the Austrians yet again. In the early stages of the war, the military situation for the Ottomans worsened as the Principalities of Wallachia, Moldova and Transylvania each had new rulers who renounced their vassalship to the Ottomans. At the Battle of Sisak, a group of ghazis sent to raid the insubordinate lands in Croatia were thoroughly defeated by tough Imperial troops fresh from savage fighting in the Low Countries. In response to this defeat, the Grand Vizier launched a large army of 13,000 Janissaries plus numerous European levies against the Christians. When the Janissaries rebelled against the Vizier's demands for a winter campaign, the Ottomans had captured little other than Veszprém.

Technological disadvantages also significantly worsened the Ottoman positions in Hungary.

In 1594 an even larger army was assembled by the Grand Vizier Sinan Pasha. In the face of this threat, the Austrians abandoned a siege of Gran, a fortress that had fallen during Suleiman's career, and then lost Raab. For the Austrians, their only comfort in the year came when the fortress of Komárno held out long enough against the Vizier's forces to retreat for the winter.

Despite the success of the previous year, the situation for the Ottomans worsened yet again in 1595. A Christian coalition of the former vassal states along with Austrian troops recaptured Esztergom and marched southward down the Danube. Michael the Brave, the prince of Wallachia started a campaign against the Turks (1594–1595), conquering several castles near the Lower Danube, including Giurgiu, Brăila, Hârşova, and Silistra, while his Moldavian allies defeated the Turks in Iaşi and other parts of Moldavia. Michael continued his attacks deep within the Ottoman Empire, taking the forts of Nicopolis, Ribnic, and Chilia and even reaching as far as Adrianople (Edirne), the former Ottoman capital city; no Christian army had set foot in the region since the days of the Byzantine Empire under the Palaiologoi.

Following the defeat of the Ottoman army in Wallachia (see the Battle of Călugăreni) and the series of unsuccessful confrontations with the Habsburgs (culminating in the devastating siege and fall of Ottoman-held Esztergom), and alarmed by the success and proximity of the threat, the new Sultan Mehmed III strangled his 19 brothers to seize power and personally marched his army to the north west of Hungary to counter his enemies' moves. In 1596 Eger fell to the Ottomans. At the decisive Battle of Keresztes, a slow Austrian response was wiped out by the Ottomans. Mehmet III's inexperience in ruling showed when he failed to reward the Janissaries for their efforts in battle; rather he punished them for not fighting well enough and thereby incited a rebellion.

The Austrians renewed the war against their enemies in the summer of 1597 with a drive southward, taking Pápa, Tata, Raab (Győr) and Veszprém. Further Habsburg victories were achieved when a Turkish relief force was defeated at Grosswardein (Nagyvárad). Enraged by these defeats, the Turks replied with a more energetic response so that by 1605, after much wasted Austrian relief efforts and failed sieges on both sides, only Raab remained in the hands of the Austrians. In that year a pro-Turkish vassal prince was elected leader of Transylvania by the Hungarian nobles and the war came to a conclusion with the Peace of Zsitva-Torok.

Conquest of Crete
After Ottoman victories at Rhodes (1522), Chios (1566) and Cyprus (1570); Crete (1669) was the last major island in the Eastern Mediterranean to be brought under the control of the Ottoman Empire. Before Ottoman capture, Crete was one of the largest and most prominent overseas holdings of the Republic of Venice. The island was significant to the Ottomans not only for its strategic position along shipping routes between Istanbul and Egypt, but also for its role as a safe harbor for pirates.

In July 1644, an Ottoman ship bound for Egypt, carrying the former Chief Black Eunuch of the Harem, the kadi of Cairo, and many pilgrims heading to Mecca, was besieged and captured by the Knights of Malta. In response, the Ottomans in 1645 amassed a sizable fleet with no stated target, although many believed it would sail on Malta. Taking advantage of surprise, the Ottomans began their campaign on Crete in June 1645. Between 1645 and 1648, the Ottomans captured nearly the entire island, and in May 1648 began a siege on the capital, Candia (modern Heraklion).

Even though the Ottomans held nearly universal control over the island, the siege of Candia would go on for 21 years. The situation was complicated by naval engagements against Christian fleets in the Aegean, as well as internal political turmoil including the deposition of Sultan Ibrahim in favor of his son, Mehmed IV. During this same period, the Ottoman-Venetian war raged on several other fronts, notably a campaign in Dalmatia and several Venetian attempts to blockade the Dardanelles. In 1666, after the resolution of several other fronts, the Ottomans dispatched sizeable reinforcements towards Crete, under the personal command of Grand Vizier Köprülü Fazıl Ahmed Pasha. Over the final two years of the siege, the Venetians, bolstered by Ottoman infighting and expecting reinforcements from France, refused several offers of peace treaties. After a failed attempt by French soldiers under the Duke of Beaufort to break the Ottoman siege, the city surrendered on 5 September 1669. With this victory, the Ottomans secured their first major territorial gain in almost a century, and simultaneously ended 500 years of Venetian rule over Crete.

Great Turkish War

In 1663, the Ottomans launched  invasion of the Habsburg Monarchy, ending at the Battle of St. Gotthard. The battle was won by the Christians, chiefly through the attack of 6,000 French troops led by La Feuillade and Coligny. The Austrians were unable to follow up on this victory due to the intervention of French forces in the Rhine; in such circumstances the Protestant allies of the Catholic Habsburgs would have proven unreliable, wanting instead to have the Austrians and themselves fight the French in a German coalition. The Ottomans therefore turned their attention north again against the Polish–Lithuanian Commonwealth. By now, the Kingdom had fallen into a terrible state; the Sejm had divided loyalties and the treasury was bankrupt. It is therefore noteworthy that John III Sobieski, king of Poland, led a decisive victory against the Ottomans at the Second battle of Khotyn.

Restless, the Ottomans were to have another chance in 1682, when the Grand Vizier marched a massive army into Hungary and to Vienna in response to Habsburg raids into Ottoman controlled Hungary.

Siege of Vienna

In 1683, after 15 months of mobilizing forces, the Grand Vizier reached Vienna to find the city well defended and prepared. Worst for the Vizier were the numerous alliances established by the Austrians, including with Sobieski. When the siege of Vienna began in 1683, Sobieski and his coalition of Germans and Poles arrived just as Vienna's defense was becoming untenable. In one of history's truly decisive battles, and simultaneously the Ottomans' high watermark; they were defeated and the siege lifted.

Reconquest of the Ottoman occupied territories of Kingdom of Hungary

In 1686, two years after the unsuccessful siege of Buda, a renewed European campaign was started to enter Buda, the erstwhile capital of medieval Hungary. This time, the Holy League's army was twice as large, containing over 74,000 men, including German, Croat, Dutch, Hungarian, English, Spanish, Czech, Italian, French, Burgundian, Danish and Swedish soldiers, along with other Europeans as volunteers, artillerymen, and officers, the Christian forces reconquered Buda. (See: Siege of Buda)

In 1687, the Ottomans raised new armies and marched north once more. However, Duke Charles intercepted the Turks at the Second Battle of Mohács and avenged the loss inflicted on the last Hungarian King over 160 years ago by Suleiman the Magnificent. The Ottomans continued to resist the southward-pressing Austrians, denying them an opportunity to negotiate from a position of strength. Only when the Ottomans suffered yet another disastrous battle at the crossing at Zenta in 1697 did the Ottomans sue for peace; the resulting treaty of Karlowitz in 1699 secured territories, the rest of Hungary and overlordship of Transylvania for the Austrians.
 
Throughout Europe Protestants and Catholics hailed Prince Eugene of Savoy as "the savior of Christendom" – English volunteers, including a son of Prince Rupert (nephew of Charles I of England) and Protestants from as far as Scotland fought in the Prince's army. For the Ottomans, the years between 1683 and 1702 were a sad time; 12 Grand Viziers were deposed in 19 years – the legacy of what was at one time under Köprülü Mehmed Pasha the most powerful position of one of the most powerful Empires in the world.

Endgame

18th century wars

Although the Great Turkish War was a disaster for the Ottomans, the Habsburgs were soon drawn into another destructive European war (the War of the Spanish Succession) against the French, their traditional rivals.

Brimming with confidence after their victories over the Russians in 1711 (Pruth River Campaign) and over the Venetians in 1715 (Ottoman–Venetian War (1714–1718)), the Ottomans declared war on the Habsburg monarchy in 1716 and marched north from Belgrade in July under the command of Grand Vizier Ali Pasha. The invasion was a catastrophe, however, and the Ottoman army was broken  and the Grand Vizier get killed  at the battle of Petrovaradin in August by an outnumbered Austrian army under the command of Prince Eugene of Savoy, who went on to capture Belgrade a year later. At the subsequent Treaty of Passarowitz in 1718, the Austrians gained possession of the Banat, Serbia and Oltenia.

Austria joined Russia in war against the Ottomans in 1737. At the Battle of Grocka in 1739 the  Austrians were defeated by the Ottomans. As a result, with the Treaty of Belgrade (1739), conquests in Serbia and Wallachia were undone. The Habsburgs ceded Serbia (including Belgrade), the southern part of the Banat of Temeswar and northern Bosnia to the Ottomans, and the Banat of Craiova (Oltenia), gained by the Treaty of Passarowitz in 1718, to Wallachia (an Ottoman subject), and set the demarcation line to the rivers Sava and Danube.

The Austro-Turkish War (1788–91) was an inconclusive struggle and Austrian territorial gains were meager in the Treaty of Sistova. The Austrians had occupied large territories including Bosnia, Belgrade and Bucharest but found themselves threatened by the imminent French Revolutionary Wars and diplomatic tensions with Prussia who threatened intervention. The gains from the enterprise came in the form of the town of Orșova in Wallachia and two small towns on the Croatian frontier.

19th century

For the next 100 years, the Austrians and the Ottomans both began to slowly lose their power to the French, British, Prussians and Russians. Both the Ottomans and the Austrians lacked the heavy industry of their other European counterparts, but the Ottomans were further behind than the Austrians. Thus, Ottoman power decayed faster than Austrian power. In the Balkans, the increasingly prevalent nationalistic cries for independence became a bigger problem for the more militarily incompetent Ottomans. After 1867, the Austrians compromised with the Hungarians to form Austria-Hungary, thus preventing a major ethnic group from rebelling in the shorter term. The same benefits could not be had with the Ottomans.

Efforts to catch up with European technology led officers and intellectuals to study abroad—a plan that backfired for the Ottomans when these individuals brought back European ideas of Enlightenment and egalitarianism. These ideas subsequently clashed with the traditional Turkish-dominated, autocratic, millet system of the Ottomans. Therefore, Ottoman power collapsed more rapidly than Austrian power, and they were powerless to stop Bosnia from being occupied in 1878 (officially annexed in 1908).

Austria and the other great powers (Britain, Prussia, Russia) saved the Ottoman dynasty from early collapse against khedivate of Egypt in the Oriental Crisis of 1840. British, Austrian and Ottoman ships attacked ports Syria and Alexandria, and the Allies took Acre, causing khedivate of Egypt to give up.

World War I

Relations between Austria and the Ottomans began to improve when they saw a common threat in Russia and a common ally in Germany in countering the threat of the Tsar. The Ottomans had hoped the Germans would industrialize their nation to defend itself against the Russians, who had taken the "anti-Turk crusade" to a more committed level, driving the Turks out of the Crimea and Caucasus. Meanwhile, the German Empire of Prussia appealed to the Austrians through a common culture, language and the lenient terms imposed after the Austro-Prussian War. The Austrians were in no hurry to see Russia advance at the cost of the Ottomans towards their borders. Thus, in the years before World War I, the two former enemies found themselves allies against the French, the Russians and the British. In 1918, the Austro-Hungarian Empire surrendered to partition under the Treaty of Saint-Germain, as did the Ottomans under the Treaty of Sèvres.

See also

Ottoman wars in Europe
Ottoman Navy
List of Ottoman conquests, sieges and landings
Ottoman decline thesis
Croatian–Ottoman wars

Notes

Further reading

 Aksan, Virginia. Ottoman Wars, 1700–1870: An Empire Besieged (Routledge, 2007).
 Barker, Thomas Mack. Double eagle and crescent: Vienna's second Turkish siege and its historical setting. SUNY Press, 1967.
 
 
 Cacavelas, Jeremias, and Frederick Henry Marshall. The Siege of Vienna by the Turks in 1683 (Cambridge University Press, 2015).
 
 
 
 
 Millar, Simon. Vienna 1683: Christian Europe Repels the Ottomans (Osprey Publishing, 2008); Short military history, well illustrated.
 Murphey, Rhoads. Ottoman Warfare, 1500–1700 (Rutgers University Press, 1999).
 Părvev, Ivan. Habsburgs and Ottomans Between Vienna and Belgrade:(1683-1739) (1995).
 
 Rothenberg, Gunther E. The Austrian military border in Croatia, 1522–1747 (1960); The Military Border in Croatia, 1740–1881: a study of an imperial institution (1966).
 

Habsburg monarchy–Ottoman Empire relations
16th-century conflicts
17th-century conflicts
18th-century conflicts
Geopolitical rivalry
Wars involving the Habsburg monarchy
Wars involving the Ottoman Empire
Wars involving Russia
Wars involving France
Wars involving Spain
Wars involving Portugal
Wars involving Croatia
Austro-Turkish Wars
Ottoman–Spanish conflicts
Early Modern period